Elektron is a Swedish developer and manufacturer of musical instruments founded in 1998, as well as having its headquarters, R&D and production in Gothenburg, Sweden. They produce mainly electronic musical instruments, but have also made effects units and software. Since 2012, there have been branch offices in Los Angeles and in Tokyo.

Musicians who use Elektron instruments include Panda Bear, Timbaland, The Knife, Sophie Xeon, Depeche Mode, and Autechre.

Product History
The first Elektron product was an analog/digital hybrid tabletop synthesizer called the SidStation. Its sound engine was a Commodore 64 SID chip. During the years 2001-2003, Elektron released the Machinedrum (a 16-voice digital drum machine) and the Monomachine (a programmable 6-voice synthesizer using single-cycle waveforms). These instruments were, like the SidStation, housed in a brushed aluminum casing.

Since then, the range of products has been extended to include the following hardware: The Model:Cycles (a beginner FM groovebox), The Digitone (an intermediate FM synthesizer groovebox), The Octatrack (a sampler), Digitakt (a sampler), Analog Keys & Analog Four (keyboard/tabletop 4-voice analog synthesizer), Analog Rytm (an 8-voice hybrid analog/digital drum machine) and Analog Heat (an 8-effects programmable analog sound processing unit). In 2015 Elektron released Overbridge (a software package used to integrate Elektron Analog hardware into a DAW) as a complement to the Analog range of instruments. In late 2016, Elektron expanded its product range by launching the Analog Drive, an 8-in-one effects drive pedal for electric guitar and bass guitar.

Early years
Elektron started working on its first electronic instrument in 1997. At the time, it was a school project, a mandatory course part of the Computer Science program at the Chalmers University of Technology in Gothenburg, Sweden. The three founders were Daniel Hansson, Anders Gärder and Mikael Räim. Hansson recalls: "There were a number of projects to choose from: build a digital landline phone, a bicycle trip computer, or a beeper. None of that seemed fun or challenging enough, so I suggested we build a synthesizer instead!" The synthesizer, called the SidStation, was initially made in a test run of ten units. The project was deemed commercially viable, so in 1998 a company was started to nurture it and Elektron ESI was born. Following the SidStation, Elektron released the Machinedrum and the Monomachine.

When the development of the Octatrack (in 2009) began, Jonas Hillman stepped in to provide the management, structural reform, and capital needed to get the company growing. Since then, Jonas has been acting CEO, majority owner and business spokesperson for the company, subsequently renamed Elektron Music Machines. With Hillman at the helm, Elektron offices were opened in Los Angeles and Tokyo. The Gothenburg office remains the company headquarters. The product portfolio has been expanded to include music production software (Overbridge) as well as analog synthesizer hardware.

Music Hardware

Analog Rytm Released in 2014. It has analog synthesis as well as digital effects and samples.  This 8-voice hybrid drum machine quickly found its way to the electronic music community. At the time, there was a trend among musicians of going back to making music using real hardware.

Analog Four was released in December 2012. The Analog Four is a tabletop 4-voice (monophonic or polyphonic) analog synthesizer with digital controls, a programmable step sequencer and digital send effects. It is also capable of CV/gate, which makes it possible to interact with practically any classic analog synthesizer or drum machine from the 1960s and onwards. The Analog Four can be described as a "compact modular" in the sense that each of the four voices has a set of pre-defined modules (oscillators and waveform generators, filters, envelopes, amplifiers and LFO:s and an overarching set of send effects (delay, reverb, chorus effect) that may be combined, routed and modulated in conventional as well as unconventional ways.

Octatrack DPS-1 was released in January 2011. The Octatrack is an 8-voice sampler with built-in sequencer and eight MIDI control tracks. The samples (streamed from an CF card, recorded live from an external source or from one of the eight on-board tracks) can be time stretched, inverted, sliced, re-shuffled, re-sampled and triggered in many different ways.
Digitakt First showcased at the NAMM trade show in January 2017. An 8-voice digital drum machine.
Syntakt A 12-track drum computer and synthesizer in a form factor similar to the Digitakt and Digitone. Syntakt has 8 digital and 4 analog voices with "machine" based sound generators. It also has digital delay and reverb effects, as well as an analog FX block with stereo overdrive and filters. It was released in April 2022.
Digitone Released in 2017, an 8-voice digital FM synthesizer.
Digitone Keys Eight voice polyphonic synthesizer keyboard with 37-key velocity and pressure sensitive keyboard with aftertouch using the Digitone’s sound engine.
Model:Cycles A six track FM based groovebox.

Model:Samples In January 2019, Elektron announced a new sample based instrument, the Model:Samples. Similarly to the Digitakt, it features tracks dedicated to sample playback, as well as a basic subtractive engine (filter, amplifier, amp envelope, LFO) and effects. It also features Elektron's signature parameter locking and sequencing capabilities. However, unlike the Digitakt, the Model:Samples has only 6 tracks instead of 8, and cannot be sampled into directly (though new samples can be loaded onto it from a computer).
Analog Heat A Stereo Analog Sound Processor. Has an assignable LFO, envelope and multi-mode filter. It has 8 main effects (including band-specific amplification, enhancement and distortion) and an equalizer. The Analog Heat is targeted at studio engineers as well as live performers. It can be programmed and played manually or connected to a DAW by installing Elektron's Overbridge software.

Discontinued Instruments

SidStation was the first Elektron instrument, released to the public in 1999. A tabletop synthesizer built on the SID chip originally found in the Commodore 64 home computer. The synthesizer had three voices, three oscillators (with various possible forms of synthesis like AM, FM and ring modulation, four rubber-coated potentiometers to control parameters including filter cut-off frequency, amplitude envelope and LFO, a jog wheel for patch selection and a telephone keypad for programming input. Even at the outset, the SidStation was a strictly limited product: it had to be discontinued when the last stock of virgin SID chips was depleted. Butchering even a single Commodore 64 for parts was out of the question. The original SidStation had a polished aluminum casing. There were a couple of special editions including red-tinted and blue tinted versions, as well as a carbon black version called SidStation Ninja.

Machinedrum A digital, 16-voice drum machine. The first version, the SPS-1, was released in 2001. The style of the product and packaging was largely designed by Jesper Kouthoofd, who went on to found the Stockholm-based company Teenage Engineering in 2005. The Machinedrum SPS-1UW ("User Wave") was introduced in 2005, which added sampling capabilities to the Machinedrum. A midi interface unit called TM-1 ("Turbo Midi") was released shortly thereafter, making transfer speeds via MIDI up to ten times faster.

Monomachine A programmable 6-voice digital synthesizer using single-cycle waveforms. A keyboard version, the SFX-6, was released in 2003, followed by the SFX-60 tabletop in 2004. After the release of the Monomachine, Elektron parted with its investors, making the company a privately owned company. In late 2007, the Machinedrum and the Monomachine were updated to MKII versions with improved hardware specifications and functionality.

Analog Keys was released in November 2013. It is a development of the Analog Four architecture.  It has a 37-key keyboard and an analog joystick for modulation and tweaking. The Analog Keys has more dedicated control keys than its tabletop sibling, including a jog wheel for quick access to pre-programmed sounds. The Analog Keys was designed to be a hands-on, tactile instrument fit for live performances while maintaining all the sequencing, sound crafting and programming capabilities of the Analog Four. At the 2016 Game Awards show in California, the artist Sonic Mayhem did a memorable performance using the Analog Keys. He performed a cover of the theme song from the classic Doom (1993 video game).
Analog Drive Was a multi-functional drive pedal, with an audio equalizer and 8 different effects settings (ranging from non-destructive amplification and enhancement to harmonic, fuzzy or complete distortion). The drive targets a new customer segment for Elektron: electric guitar and bass players.

Music Software
Overbridge was released in 2015. This software lets a musician plug their hardware (Analog Keys, Analog Four, Analog Rytm, Analog Heat, Digitakt, Digitone, Digitone Keys, Syntakt) into a computer via USB and access it using a DAW. The DAW is "fooled" into thinking the analog hardware is an audio plug-in instrument that can be played, programmed, automated and recorded just like a software instrument. If an Analog Keys or Analog Four is connected, Overbridge can also be used to control virtually any classic modular synth or drum machine with CV/gate or DIN sync capabilities. In other words, with an Overbridge setup, it is possible to play and automate, for example, a VCS 3 from 1969 from a laptop. Overbridge was in beta for 5 years since its inception, leading to much criticism from users, but has moved out of beta state, to a public release on April 16, 2020.

Musicians
Musicians who use Elektron instruments include Sophie Xeon, Warpaint, Kid Koala, Del tha Funky Homosapien, Susanne Sundfør, John Frusciante, The Knife, Air, Nine Inch Nails, New Order, Jean-Michel Jarre, Youth Code, Wilco, Aux 88, Cevin Key, Smashing Pumpkins, Mogwai, The Horrors, Plaid, Factory Floor, Matt McJunkins, Arcane Roots, The Bug, The Chemical Brothers, Thom Yorke and many others.

Awards and accolades
Octatrack won the MusicRadar "Sampler of the Year" award in 2011.
The Analog Four received the FutureMusic "Hardware of the Year" award in 2013.
The Analog Rytm received the FutureMusic "Hardware of the Year" award in 2014 and the Electronic Musician "Editor's Choice Award" in 2015.
Overbridge won the Red Dot "best of the best" design award in 2016, and the Design S premium award.
Analog Heat won the Music Radar "best hardware/outboard effects of the year" in 2016.

See also
The Octatrack
The Monomachine
The SidStation

References

External links

Music equipment manufacturers
Synthesizer manufacturing companies of Sweden
Swedish brands
Musical instrument manufacturing companies of Sweden
Manufacturing companies based in Gothenburg
Privately held companies of Sweden
Swedish companies established in 1998